The Doolough Tragedy is an event that took place during the Great Irish Famine close to Doo Lough in southwest County Mayo. At least seven (and perhaps 20 or significantly more) starving people died after being "forced to walk for miles to present themselves for inspection" by poor law union officials who would determine whether they would continue to receive outdoor relief.

Events 
On Friday 30 March 1849, two officials of the Westport Poor Law Union arrived in Louisburgh to inspect those people in receipt of outdoor relief to verify that they should continue to receive it. Several hundred people who had gathered for the inspection, or later did so, were consequently instructed to appear at Delphi Lodge at 7am the following morning if they wished to continue receiving relief. For much of the night and day that followed seemingly hundreds of destitute and starving people had to undertake what for them, given their existing state of debilitation, was an extremely fatiguing journey, in very bad weather.

A letter-writer to The Mayo Constitution newspaper reported shortly afterwards that the bodies of seven people, including women and children, were subsequently discovered on the roadside between Delphi and Louisburgh overlooking the shores of Doolough lake, and that nine or ten more people never reached their homes. While some sources put the total number of deaths at approximately 20 people, local sources suggest that the number who perished was far higher.

A cross and an annual 'Famine Walk' between Louisburgh and Doolough commemorates this event. The monument in Doolough valley has an inscription from Mahatma Gandhi: "How can men feel themselves honoured by the humiliation of their fellow beings?"

References

Great Famine (Ireland)
1849 in Ireland
Poor Law in Britain and Ireland